The BMP-1 is a Soviet amphibious tracked infantry fighting vehicle, in service 1966–present. BMP stands for Boyevaya Mashina Pyekhoty 1, meaning "infantry fighting vehicle, 1st serial model". The BMP-1 was the first mass-produced infantry fighting vehicle (IFV) of the Soviet Union. It was called the M-1967, BMP and BMP-76PB by NATO before its correct designation was known.

The Soviet military leadership saw any future wars as being conducted with nuclear, chemical and biological weapons. A new design, like the BMP, combining the properties of an armored personnel carrier (APC) and a light tank would allow infantry to operate from the relative safety of its armoured, radiation-shielded interior in contaminated areas and to fight alongside it in uncontaminated areas. It would increase infantry squad mobility, provide fire support to them, and also be able to fight alongside main battle tanks.

The BMP-1 was first tested in combat in the 1973 Yom Kippur War, where it was used by Egyptian and Syrian forces. Based on lessons learned from this conflict, and early experiences in the Soviet–Afghan War, a version with improved fighting qualities was developed, the BMP-2. It was accepted into service in August 1980.

In 1987, the BMP-3, a radically redesigned vehicle with a completely new weapon, entered service in limited numbers with the Soviet Army.

Currently, in 2022 the BMP-1 is also used by both the Ukrainian Armed Forces and the Russian armed forces in the current ongoing war in Ukraine due to the fact that the vehicle is much more widely available than the more modern BMP-3.

Development 

The Red Army Mechanized infantry tactics during the 1950s were similar to World War II methods in which APCs were used as "battle taxis". They would keep the infantry in close proximity to the battle-tanks during movement, but on enemy contact they would unload their infantry before retreating to safer areas. This was in contrast to the German doctrine of infantry fighting vehicles manifested in the Schützenpanzer Lang HS.30, where the vehicles were supposed to stay with the tanks and engage lighter targets, both to take a burden off the tanks and to support their infantry squads.

Existing APCs offered little or no protection from either nuclear or chemical weapons, as they were either open-topped or could not be sealed sufficiently. Furthermore, the infantry had to disembark to be able to use their weapons.

The requirement for the BMP, which was first drawn up in the late 1950s, stressed speed, good armament, and the ability for all squad members to fire from within the vehicle. The armament had to provide direct support for dismounted infantry in the attack and defense, and to be able to destroy comparable light armored vehicles. The vehicle needed to protect the crew from .50 cal machinegun fire and 20–23 mm caliber autocannons across the frontal arc, as well as from light shell fragments at distances between 500 m and 800 m.

Firepower consisted of the innovative combination of the 73 mm 2A28 Grom gun and a launcher for the 9M14 Malyutka (AT-3A Sagger A) anti-tank wire-guided missile (ATGM).

Requirements were issued to the various design bureaus between 1959 and 1960. There was a question as to whether the BMP should be tracked or wheeled, so a number of experimental configurations were explored, including hybrid wheeled/tracked designs.

The tracked Ob'yekt 764 (codename Object 764) was chosen because its front-engine design provided a convenient and fast way of mounting and dismounting through two rear doors. The original prototype was built in 1964, followed by the improved Ob'yekt 765 in 1965, which was accepted by the Army in 1966, under a designation BMP-1. The 120th Guards Motor Rifle Division was the first formation in the Soviet Union to test prototypes of the new BMP ("objekt 765") infantry fighting vehicle in January–November 1965, under the command of Guards Major Vasiliy Samodelov. Small-scale production began in 1966.

Models 

A large number of variants of the BMP-1 were produced, with the most notable IFV variants being: BMP-2, MLI-84 and Boragh.

Table of models

Production history 
The BMP went into production with the Soviet Army in 1966. The first series (Ob'yekt 765 Sp1, "specification 1") was produced until 1969. It was replaced by the improved production model, the BMP-1 (the Ob'yekt 765 Sp2), which was produced from 1969 until 1973. This, in turn, was replaced by the Ob'yekt 765 Sp3, which was a modernized, 200 kg heavier version that was produced from 1973 to 1979. A number of improvements were made to the reliability of the chassis, engine and transmission during mass production.

The last version of the BMP-1 IFV (BMP-1P, Ob'yekt 765 Sp4), which was produced from 1979 to 1983, was armed with a more powerful ATGM launcher 9P135M-1 for the ATGM "Konkurs"/"Fagot". The main manufacturer of the BMP-1 and its different variants was the Kurgan Machine Building Works (Kurganskiy Mashinostroitelyniy Zavod). The PRP-3 artillery reconnaissance vehicles were produced by the Chelyabinsk Tractor Works (ChTZ). The PRP-4/PRP-4M artillery reconnaissance vehicles were produced by the Rubtsovsk Engineering Works (RMZ). Upgrades of the BMP-1 were performed by KMZ as well as by tank repair workshops of the Ministry of Defence during scheduled and major overhauls. More than 20,000 BMP-1s and vehicles based on it were built in the USSR.

BMP-1s were produced under license by Czechoslovakia (BVP-1), Romania (MLI-84) and India. Since 1986, the People's Republic of China has produced its own unlicensed copy called the Type 86 (WZ 501). The number of Type 86 IFVs and vehicles based upon it is around 3,000. It is still in service with the People's Liberation Army. From 1997, Iran produced its own modification of the BMP-1, the Boragh, which resembles the Chinese WZ 503.

Variants and modernization 

In the mid-1970s, after analysis of the use of light AFVs during the Yom Kippur, Angolan and Vietnam wars, a modernization program was begun that resulted in the BMP-1P (Ob'yekt 765 Sp4). The main changes were the replacement of the largely ineffective 9M14M Malyutka ATGM with the more reliable, longer range and more powerful 9P135M or 9P135M-1 ATGM launcher.

The 9P135M-1 launcher was capable of firing 9M111 and 9M111-2 Fagot ATGMs. The Malyutka loading hatch was usually welded shut and the mounting bracket was removed. The new missiles were somewhat difficult to use since the gunner had to stand in his open hatch, exposing himself to hostile fire. It is possible to detach the 9P135M(1) ATGM launcher from the turret and use it from the ground.

The BMP-1P was equipped with neutron weapon protection covering and a new fire-extinguishing system for protection against napalm. Later BMP-1Ps were fitted with an array of six 902V "Tucha"  calibre smoke grenade launchers at the rear of the turret. Some were equipped with the track-width KMT-10 mine plow. The BMP-1P replaced the BMP-1 in production in 1979. Many BMP-1s were upgraded to the new standard during the 1980s.

The BMP-1PG model added a  AGS-17 "Plamya" automatic grenade launcher on top of the turret on the left side, for which it carries 290 grenades. Some BMP-1s had the AGS-17 added during major repairs (Ob'yekt 765Sp8).

A non-amphibious BMP-1D (the so-called 'Afghan' variant), was built in 1982 for assault units in Afghanistan. It had 5 mm thick appliqué steel armor plates on the hull sides with holes for side firing ports as well as armor plate under the commander's and driver's seats for added protection against mines. It had large steel armored skirts fitted to the sides of the hull covering the suspension. Firing ports were added into the top hatches of the troop compartment and a stowage box was placed on the roof at the rear of the hull on some vehicles. The 9S428 ATGM launcher was often removed and replaced by an AGS-17 automatic grenade launcher.

Due to experience in Afghanistan, a new version with enhanced fighting capabilities, the BMP-2, was introduced in 1980. It had a new two-man turret armed with a 30 mm 2A42 multi-purpose autocannon and a 9P135M-1 ATGM launcher capable of firing SACLOS guided 9M113 Konkurs and 9M113M Konkurs-M as well as 9M111 and 9M111-2 Fagot ATGMs.

Later modernization plans included mounting the turret of the BMD-2 IFV on to BMP-1s, but the vehicle never left the design phase. Recent proposals for the modernization of BMP-1s include mounting new turrets armed with a 2A72  autocannon, approved in 2018, or a TKB-799 Kliver one-man weapons station with a computerized fire control system, armed with a missile pod (which can be armed with either four 9M133 Kornet (AT-14 Spriggan) or 9M133F Kornet ATGMs or 9K38 Igla (SA-18 Grouse) SAMs), a 30 mm 2A72 dual-purpose autocannon and a  PKTM coaxial machine gun (BMP-1AM 'Basurmanin' and BMP-1M respectively).

The BMP-1AM Basurmanin is an upgraded version of BMP-1 developed by The Uralvagonzavod (UVZ) research-and-manufacturing corporation (a subsidiary of the Rostec state corporation). The BMP-1AM is BMP-1 with the original turret replaced by the turret from BTR-82A with a 2A72 30 mm autocannon, a Kalashnikov PKTM 7.62 mm medium machinegun, and 902V Tucha smoke grenade launchers. The turret will be fitted with the TKN-4GA combined day-night sighting system. The 2A72 cannon will be able to use air burst munitions. Approved in 2018, it is the most recent Russian BMP-1 upgrade. The Russian army plans to upgrade all of their BMP-1s and BMP-1Ps to BMP-1AM level.

See BMP-1 variants article for a complete list of BMP-1 modifications and variants based upon it.

Description 

The BMP-1 is a fully amphibious tracked vehicle, with a front-engined chassis developed especially for it, a welded steel hull with a sharp, sloping front with a conspicuously ridged surface, a centrally located, flat, truncated cone turret and a troop compartment at the rear.

Driver's station 

The driver sits in the front on the left side of the hull. He has three TNPO-170 periscope vision-blocks to provide vision when his hatch is closed. The driver's center vision block can be replaced with a TVNO-2 active night binocular vision device for use in night and poor visibility conditions or with a TNPO-350B extended periscope when swimming with the trim vane erected. The BMP was the first Soviet armored vehicle to use a simple yoke steering system.

Commander's station 
A dual mode (day/night) TKN-3B 5x/4.2x magnification binocular vision device is coupled to the infrared searchlight. Two periscope vision blocks are fitted with a heating and cleaning system. The commander's station is equipped with an R-123M radio set.

Turret 

The BMP-1 has a conical turret equipped with a fume extraction system and an electric traverse drive with a manual backup system. The main gun has a dead-zone over the commander's hatch (between the 10:00 and 11:00 o'clock positions), where the gun must be elevated over the infra-red searchlight to avoid crushing it. When the gun is facing backwards, it prevents hatches on top of the troop compartment from opening. The low profile of the turret makes it a difficult target. The same turret is used in the BMD-1.

Gunner's station 
The gunner's station is located to the left of the main gun. The gunner has a dual mode (day/night) 1PN22M1 6x/6.7x magnification image intensifying monocular periscope sight, four day-use periscope vision blocks, and an OU-3GK removable infrared or white-light searchlight.

The original sight was replaced with the 1PN22M2, which has an additional scale for the OG-15V HE-Frag rounds used by the Ob'yekt 765Sp3, produced from July 1974.

Armament 
Gun

The main armament is the 73 mm 2A28 "Grom" low pressure smoothbore semi-automatic gun. It is fed from a 40-round magazine located around the turret ring. The cyclic rate of fire is 8 to 10 rounds per minute. The gun returns to an elevation of +3° 30' to reload after each shot if the autoloader is used. The gun can be reloaded by hand if necessary. Some units removed the autoloader altogether when new vehicles were delivered, but the mechanized ammunition conveyor magazine was kept. High-explosive ammunition, introduced in 1974, can only be loaded manually, from a conveyor.

The 2A28 'Grom' smoothbore gun fires the same PG-15V projectiles as the SPG-9 infantry light recoilless gun, but with a smaller propellant charge. The PG-15V HEAT warhead can penetrate  of steel armor – more than enough to penetrate the frontal armor of NATO MBTs of the 1970s, such as the US M60A1, the British Chieftain or the German Leopard 1.

The disadvantage of the BMP-1 is the small elevation angle of the gun (only 15 degrees).

OG-15V high explosive ammunition was made available from 1974. The warhead has twice the weight of explosives as the anti-armor PG-15V. It is intended for use against troops or soft targets.

A coaxial 7.62 mm PKT machine gun is mounted to the right of the main armament for which the BMP-1 carries 2,000 rounds.

The 2A28 'Grom' gun and PKT coaxial machine gun cannot be accurately fired while the vehicle is on the move over rough ground as the turret is unstabilised.

Missile
Mounted on the gun mantlet, the ATGM launcher is capable of firing the 9M14 Malyutka, (NATO: AT-3A Sagger A), the 9M14M Malyutka-M (NATO: AT-3B Sagger B) and the 9M14P Malyutka-P (NATO: AT-3C Sagger C). The 9M14P missile can be used in manual mode only, like older missiles, without the advantage of semi-automatic guidance.

The BMP-1 carries four ATGMs with their launching rails as a standard (two inside the turret and two inside the hull). In theory, a fifth missile can be carried on the launcher. The missiles are loaded onto a rail launcher through a small rectangular hatch in a turret's roof behind the launcher. These missiles can only be fired in daylight because of the lack of a night sight. A guidance device used in the BMP-1 has the code 9S428.

Besides possessing such advantages as interference immunity and simple control equipment, wire-guided ATGMs are also hampered by significant disadvantages such as a relatively low flight speed, response delay, the inability to load a new missile until the previous one has reached its target and a very long minimum range. Successful operation of the ATGM while the vehicle is on the move requires a very skilled gunner.

Those BMP-1s still in Russian service that were not modernized to the BMP-1P standard, can now use 9M14-2 Malyutka-2 (NATO: AT-3D Sagger D) ATGMs (developed in 1995), which have either a tandem shaped-charge or high-explosive thermobaric warhead.

The BMP-1 was a threat to NATO APCs, light AFVs, and even MBTs of its time, by use of its main gun or ATGM. Nevertheless, the strong anti-tank focus of its armament didn't provide sufficient firepower against enemy unarmored vehicles, infantry and light fortified positions, especially during mountain battles (mostly due to the low elevation angle of the main gun). The appearance of the more successful BMP-2 armed with the 30mm 2A42 dual-purpose autocannon solved this serious problem.

Troop compartment 

The troop compartment located at the rear of the vehicle can carry up to eight soldiers. There are four firing ports on each side of the vehicle and a single firing port in the left rear door. A combination fume extractor hose and cartridge deflector is provided to clip on to weapons at each station.

Soldiers sit on two padded benches along the center line of the vehicle and face the sides. Vehicle batteries, electric equipment and the main  fuel tank are located between the benches, with tool stowage beneath. There are four large D-shaped hatches in the roof of the hull, which can be opened from the troop compartment. The airtight rear doors of the troop compartment contain fuel tanks.

Space inside the troop compartment is limited. There is little room for personal equipment, which leads to it being stowed outside while on operation, sometimes limiting rearward traverse of the turret. The seating is cramped, especially for troops in full battle dress.

In the BMP-1 and BMP-2, ammunition is stored near or even inside the compartment, which can lead to a catastrophic failure in case of a hull breach.

Maneuverability 
The 300 horsepower (224 kW) UTD-20 six-cylinder four-stroke diesel engine is located in the centre of the front hull, behind the transmission, with the cooling system to the right and radiator above. The engine drives a manual gearbox with five forward and one reverse gear. The steering system considerably reduces driver fatigue, especially when compared to the usual lever systems to control the tracks in the older tracked AFVs. The BMP is very fast and maneuverable, even if the long, pointed nose can give some problems when crossing large trenches. The diesel engine is of a multifuel design and can use DL (summer) or DZ (winter). It can also use TS-1 kerosene.

It can be driven on 25° side slopes and can climb 35° slopes.

The drive sprockets are at the front with six road wheels, using torsion bar suspension. The BMP-1 has a ground pressure of 0.6 kg/cm² (8.5 psi) and is able to cross snow-covered and boggy terrain. It has the range, off-road speed and cross-country ability necessary to keep up with fast-moving MBTs.

Amphibious capability 

The BMP-1 is amphibious, propelling itself in the water using its tracks, assisted by hydrodynamic fairings on the track upper side covers. The shape of the hull and some features (hollow road wheels and road wheel arms with air chambers) aid flotation. More challenging conditions require engineer support.

Before entering the water, the trim vane at the front of the hull should be erected to prevent water from flooding over the bow. While in its travelling position, it serves as additional frontal armor. The rear doors of the troop compartment must be closed tightly before entering the water. Before entering the water, either a full crew of eight troopers or an equivalent ballast must be present in the rear of the vehicle, otherwise vehicle balance is upset and it could sink, as it's naturally front heavy.

The BMP-1 can cross water obstacles such as rivers and lakes but it is not intended for sea landing operations.

Armor protection 

The BMP-1's steeply sloped frontal armor can withstand artillery shell fragments, small arms fire and existing .50 caliber (12.7 mm) heavy machine gun AP and API rounds over 60° of the frontal arc from all distances. The very high angle of the hull frontal armor increases the probability of ricochets, and the trim vane in the traveling position adds little additional protection. On most examples, the front armor is immune to 20 millimeter Oerlikon KAD or HS820 auto-cannon fire from ranges greater than 100 meters, but armor quality varies quite significantly with the nationality of a factory.

The side, rear and top armor protect the BMP-1 from 7.62 mm small arms fire from most distances as well as smaller artillery shell fragments, but do not protect the vehicle against 12.7 mm heavy machine gun fire from close distances or larger artillery shell fragments. Ground tests demonstrated that rear doors with their fuel tanks filled with sand withstood hits from standard 12.7 mm rounds. In Afghanistan and Chechnya, armor-piercing 7.62 mm rounds fired from general-purpose machine guns at ranges of around 30–50 m sometimes penetrated the rear doors and hatches.

During the First Persian Gulf War, the armor protection of the BMP-1 proved vulnerable to the armor-piercing rounds of the US M2/M3 Bradley's  M242 Bushmaster autocannon. During the intense fighting in Chechnya, no penetration of the BMP-1/BMD-1 turret front armor were noticed because the turret made for a small target and had relatively thick frontal armor compared to other parts of the vehicle.

Armor thickness is as follows:
 26–33 mm gun mantlet
 23 mm at 42° turret front (36 mm LOS thickness)
 19 mm at 36° turret side (27 mm LOS thickness)
 13 mm at 30° turret rear (17 mm LOS thickness)
 6 mm at 0° turret top
 7 mm at 80° upper hull front (46 mm LOS thickness)
 19 mm at 57° hull lower front (40 mm LOS thickness)
 16 mm at 14° hull upper side (19 mm LOS thickness)
 18 mm at 0° hull lower side
 16 mm at 19° hull rear (19 mm LOS thickness)
 6 mm at 0° hull top
 7 mm at 0° hull belly rear

Protection issues 

The BMP-1 had significant shortcomings in its protection scheme, which only became obvious during the Soviet–Afghan War. It seats its driver and commander in a tandem layout, on the left side of the hull front, alongside the diesel engine. When an antitank mine hits the BMP-1s left track, the explosion usually destroyed one to three left side roadwheels, penetrated the bottom, and killed or seriously wounded both the driver and the commander, which caused painful losses of specialist personnel in the Soviet Army. Drivers laid sandbags on the bottom of their compartment in an effort to protect themselves against possible mine attack. The same kind of explosion under the right track was much less dramatic for the driver and the commander, who remained relatively safe.

The experience of Yom Kippur War and Soviet–Afghan War showed that the armored hull of the BMP-1 cannot withstand hits of 12.7-mm bullets on the sides, and the hit of an anti-tank grenade RPG, as a rule, caused the vehicle to ignite, followed by an explosion of ammunition.

If the vehicle hit a tilt-rod antitank mine, its steeply sloped lower front glacis plate allowed the mine's arming rod to tilt with little resistance until the mine was well under the chassis. When it eventually detonated, the blast was usually sufficient to kill or badly wound the driver and the commander. From 1982, the Soviet 40th Army in Afghanistan began to receive improved BMP-1Ds (the so-called "Afghan" variant), which, among other improvements, included an additional armored plate under the driver's and commander's stations. This situation was addressed in the later BMP-2 design, where the commander shares the two-man turret with the gunner.

There is a protection issue concerning the reloading of the 9M14 "Malyutka" and 9M14M "Malyutka-M" ATGMs in NBC conditions, because doing it through the small hatch from inside the vehicle would negate whatever protection the fighting compartment's NBC protection suite gave.

The compactness and low silhouette of the vehicle are generally advantages on a battlefield. Critical areas, such as the engine compartment, the ammunition storage area, fuel cells and the troop compartment, are located in a manner that became the standard for many IFVs and APCs. Penetration anywhere in these areas will often result in mobility and/or firepower damage and/or disabling of the personnel.

The BMP-1 and BMP-2 series vehicles share a major drawback with many Soviet tanks. Ammunition is stored near or even inside the fighting compartment, which makes them more vulnerable to a hit from an anti-tank round or a missile across the side arc. If that happens, the ammunition often explodes, killing everyone and completely destroying the vehicle. During the fighting in Afghanistan and Chechnya, hits by rocket-propelled grenades (RPGs) penetrated the BMP-1's armor in 95% of cases. This often resulted in the vehicle burning until the ammunition exploded. Due to these limitations, Soviet/Russian soldiers customarily rode on the outside of the BMP-1, sitting on top of the hull while in combat zones.

The armor of BMP-1 IFVs is insufficient to deal with AP cannon rounds – sufficiently thick armor would increase the weight of the BMP-1 considerably and jeopardize its amphibious ability. Some military analysts support the idea of returning to the concept of open-topped APCs, as the armor of light AFVs cannot protect the crew from anti-tank weapons. Modern APCs are mostly used in local conflicts instead of hypothetical large-scale wars with NBC weapons.

A problem most often cited by western analysts is the design of the main fuel tank. Due to the low profile of the vehicle, the designers have had to place the fuel tank between the two rows of outward-facing seats, meaning that the infantrymen sit very close to the bulk of the vehicle's fuel storage. Extra fuel is carried in the hollow armored rear doors. Therefore, a hit by an armor-piercing incendiary round would set the fuel contained there on fire, especially if the fuel is kerosene instead of diesel. The burning fuel would move into the crew compartment, resulting in the death or injury of the infantrymen (if they are unable to leave the vehicle via the roof hatches), and a possible explosion.

However, the rear door tanks are almost always empty when the BMP goes into combat, as they are only meant to increase the road travel range of the vehicle. In intense war areas where the BMP sees action often, and it is relatively near its base of operations, instructions highly recommend detaching the rear door tanks from the fuel system, filling them with sand as additional protection for the troop compartment, and adding fuel to the internal main fuel tank from other sources when the need arises.

This was not practiced by some BMP-1s crews during a number of local conflicts, e.g., in Chechnya, which resulted in frequent attempts by the enemy to hit the rear doors of the BMP-1s. The inner fuel tank is more vulnerable than that of many modern IFVs – the thin side armor means that penetration is likely to occur to the inner fuel tank as well.

The BMP-1 has no air conditioning or air cooling system. Its crew members and passengers suffer heavily in hot climates as its air filtration system and exhaust-ventilation fans cannot provide any comfort at high temperatures. During the Yom Kippur War, crews kept some of the roof hatches open. This meant that they were vulnerable to machine gun fire from higher ground. Only a few examples of the BMP-1 were intended for export – mainly to countries with a hot climate (for example, the Slovak-Belorussian "Cobra-S"). They are equipped with an air conditioning system. The cooling system for the engine is improved, as is the additional forced air cooling system of the engine compartment and radiator. The exhaust system helps to eject gases together with hot air from the engine compartment through the grille located on the right side of the hull roof in front of the turret.

Equipment 
The BMP-1 can make its own smoke screen by injecting vaporized diesel fuel into the exhaust manifold using the TDA engine thermal smoke generating system.

A number of BMP-1s were fitted with mountings for the KMT-10 plow-type mine-clearing system in the early 1980s. It is installed on the front of the hull in line with the tracks. The plow weighs  and can be attached in 30 minutes. Emergency detaching takes around 10 minutes. The KMT-10 is intended for clearing anti-tank mines under different ground conditions.

It is pneumatically driven and takes four seconds to switch from the traveling position to the digging position. A chain mounted between the plows can detonate tilt-rod mines.

When the NBC protection system is configured and operating, the crew and passengers are protected from chemical weapons, biological agents and nuclear fallout by an air filtration and overpressure system, which consists of the NBC filter element and the blower/dust separator.

BMP-1s were equipped with one RPG-7/RPG-7V shoulder-launched anti-tank rocket-propelled grenade (RPG) and five PG-7 rounds or one 9K32 Strela-2/9K38 Igla man-portable anti-aircraft missile launcher and two replacement missiles. It carries 1600 rounds for two PK general-purpose machine guns.

Service history 

Currently, the major BMP-1 operators, each with over a thousand vehicles in active service, are Russia, India, Poland, and the People's Republic of China.

Soviet Union and Russia 
The BMP-1 entered service with the Soviet Army in 1966. The BMP-1 was first seen by Westerners during the 7 November 1967 military parade in Moscow. Its appearance created a stir in the West, where lightly armed APCs were still the norm for transportation and infantry support on the battlefield.

In the Soviet Army, BMP-1s were typically issued to motorized rifle divisions and the motorized rifle regiments of tank divisions, where they replaced the BTR-152, BTR-50P and some BTR-60P APCs.

Currently, BMP-1s and vehicles based upon it are used by the Russian Army and internal security troops of the Russian Ministry of Internal Affairs (MVD).

Afghanistan 

BMP-1s were widely used in Afghanistan by motorized rifle and tank units. They were also operated by some special forces. In 1982, as a result of combat experience, a version with applique armor was introduced, called BMP-1D (D='desantnaya'=paratroopers). That version did not have amphibious capability [not critical in the Afghan environment]. Many field modifications were made to their BMP-1s by various units.

Syria 
The BMP-1 has seen wide use by all factions fighting in the Syrian Civil War due to large numbers being in stock.

Since 2017 the Hayat Tahrir al-Sham have been using captured BMP-1s as vehicle-borne improvised explosive devices in suicide attacks. The vehicle's advantages in this role are the large amount of explosives it can carry, the off-road capability afforded by tracks and the armour that both protects the driver from fire and amplifies the effect of the explosion.

Russo-Ukrainian War 
The BMP-1 is still currently being used in the ongoing 2022 Russian invasion of Ukraine by both Russian and Ukrainian forces due to its wide availability compared to the much more modern but less produced BMP-3.

Others 

Other BMP operators have included Poland, Egypt, Syria, the People's Republic of China, Afghanistan, India, Iraq, North Korea, East Germany, Greece, Slovakia, Sweden, Cambodia, and Vietnam.
 The Ontario Regiment Museum has an operational BMP 1.

See also 
Comparable vehicles
 BMD-1 – related family of Soviet airborne fighting vehicles (USSR)
 BMP-2 (USSR)
 BMP-3 (USSR)
 BMP-23 (Bulgaria)
 AMX-10P (France)
 ASCOD (Austria and Spain)
 BVP M80 IFV (Yugoslavia)
 Combat Vehicle 90 (Sweden)
 Dardo IFV (Italy)
 Lazika, (Georgia)
 M2 Bradley (US)
 Marder (IFV) (Germany)
 MLI-84 – a Romanian IFV based on a modified BMP chassis
 Type 86 – a Chinese copy of the BMP-1
 Warrior IFV (UK)

References

Bibliography

External links 

 
 
 
 
 
 
 
 UTD-20 battle tank engine – Working process, intake stroke, compression stroke.

 
Tracked infantry fighting vehicles
Cold War armoured fighting vehicles of the Soviet Union
Amphibious infantry fighting vehicles
Fire support vehicles
Infantry fighting vehicles of the Soviet Union
Infantry fighting vehicles of the Cold War
Military vehicles introduced in the 1960s
Infantry fighting vehicles of India
Kurganmashzavod products